Audenshaw is a tram stop serving Audenshaw on the East Manchester Line (EML) of Greater Manchester's light-rail Metrolink system. The station opened on 9 October 2013 as part of Phase 3b of the system's expansion, ahead of the originally-publicised schedule of the winter of 2013–14. It is located on Droylsden Road at the junctions of Lumb Lane and Manchester Road.

Services

Services are mostly every 12 minutes on all routes.

References

External links
 Light Rail Transit Association
Metrolink stop information
Audenshaw area map

Tram stops in Tameside
Tram stops on the Bury to Ashton-under-Lyne line
Audenshaw